also known as Aida Ammei, was a Japanese mathematician in the Edo period.

He made significant contributions to the fields of number theory and geometry, and furthered methods for simplifying continued fractions.

Aida created an original symbol for "equal".  This was the first appearance of the notation for equal in East Asia.

Selected works
In a statistical overview derived from writings by and about Aida Yasuaki, OCLC/WorldCat encompasses roughly 50 works in 50+ publications in 1 language and 50+ library holdings.

1784 —  OCLC 22057343766
1785 —  OCLC 22049703851, Counter-arguments with seiyo sampō
1787 —  OCLC 22056510030, Counter-arguments with seiyo sampō, new edition
1788 —  OCLC 22056510044
1797 —  OCLC 22057185824
1801 —  OCLC 22057185770
 1811 —

See also
Sangaku, the custom of presenting mathematical problems, carved in wood tablets, to the public in shinto shrines
Soroban, a Japanese abacus
Japanese mathematics

Notes

References
Endō Toshisada (1896). . Tōkyō: _. 
Restivo, Sal P. (1992).  Mathematics in Society and History: Sociological Inquiries. Dordrecht: Kluwer Academic Publishers. ; 
Selin, Helaine. (1997).   Encyclopaedia of the History of Science, Technology, and Medicine in Non-Western Cultures. Dordrecht: Kluwer/Springer. ; 
Shimodaira, Kazuo. (1970). "Aida Yasuaki", Dictionary of Scientific Biography. New York: Charles Scribner's Sons. 
David Eugene Smith and Yoshio Mikami. (1914).   A History of Japanese Mathematics. Chicago: Open Court Publishing. – note alternate online, full-text copy at archive.org

External links

18th-century Japanese mathematicians
19th-century Japanese mathematicians
Number theorists
Geometers
1747 births
1817 deaths
Japanese writers of the Edo period